Rupa So.Si. Chaudhari is a Nepalese politician, belonging to the Communist Party of Nepal (Maoist Centre). In the 2008 Constituent Assembly election she was elected from the Kailali-1 constituency, winning 21780 votes.

References

Living people
21st-century Nepalese women politicians
21st-century Nepalese politicians
Communist Party of Nepal (Maoist Centre) politicians
Nepalese atheists
Year of birth missing (living people)
Members of the 1st Nepalese Constituent Assembly
Nepal MPs 2022–present